Nashwa Abo Alhassan Eassa is a nano-particle physicist from Sudan. She is an assistant professor of physics at Al-Neelain University in Khartoum.

Education
Eassa received her BSc in physics from the University of Khartoum in 2004. She earned her Master of Science in nanotechnology and materials physics from Sweden's Linköping University in 2007.

Career
She has been a lecturer and assistant professor of physics at Al-Neelain University since 2007. She earned her PhD from Nelson Mandela Metropolitan University (NMMU) in 2012. Since 2013, Eassa is pursuing a post-doctoral fellowship in nanophotonics at NMMU. She founded the non-governmental organisation Sudanese Women in Sciences in 2013 and is a member of Organization for Women in Science for the Developing World's South African Institute of Physics.

In 2015, Eassa won the Elsevier Foundation Award for Early Career Women Scientists in the Developing World. The award recognised her research on lessening film accumulation on the surface of high-speed semiconductors.

Eassa is involved in the development of nanotube structures and titanium oxide nanoparticles. She is also involved in projects to develop methods to split water molecules for hydrogen collection and to sanitise water with solar radiation.

She has been a candidate as Arab Countries Vice-President for Organization for Women in Science for the Developing World.

References

External links 

 Sudanese Women in Sciences 

Year of birth missing (living people)
Living people
Nanotechnologists
Academic staff of Neelain University
Academic staff of Nelson Mandela University
Nelson Mandela University alumni
Particle physicists
Sudanese scientists
University of Khartoum alumni